Timur Yafarov (born 30 November 1986) is a former Uzbekistan international footballer who played as a midfielder.

Career statistics

International

As of match played 24 December 2007.

References

1986 births
Living people
Uzbekistani footballers
Uzbekistan international footballers
FC Bunyodkor players
Association football midfielders
Uzbekistan Super League players